In the 2001 Armenian Premier League, FC Pyunik were the champions.

Overview
 FC Armenicum, Karabakh Yerevan, Lori Vanadzor, and FC Kotayk were promoted from the Armenian First League last year. FC Armenicum were dissolved and yielded their place to the revived FC Pyunik.
 Newly established Dinamo-2000 Yerevan are allowed to participate in the premier league without competing in the Armenian First League first.
 In August 2001, Araks Ararat FC were dissolved and Spartak Yerevan took their place in the championship.
 FC Banants Kotayk demerged from Kotayk Abovyan and the owner of the club decided to move the club from Abovyan to Yerevan, and thus Banants Kotayk became FC Banants Yerevan. Despite not participating as a separate team in the 2000 Armenian First League, the club was allowed to participate in the 2001 Armenian Premier League season.
 Kilikia FC did not pay entrance fee and refused to play twice, leading to their expulsion. At the end of the season they were also relegated along with Lori Vanadzor.

League table

Results

Top goalscorers

See also
 2001 in Armenian football
 2001 Armenian First League
 2001 Armenian Cup

Armenian Premier League seasons
1
Armenia
Armenia